List of UK Singles Chart number ones of the 1950s
 List of UK Singles Chart number ones of the 1960s
 List of UK Singles Chart number ones of the 1970s
 List of UK Singles Chart number ones of the 1980s
 List of UK Singles Chart number ones of the 1990s
 List of UK Singles Chart number ones of the 2000s
 List of UK Singles Chart number ones of the 2010s
 List of UK Singles Chart number ones of the 2020s
 List of UK Singles Chart Christmas number ones

The Christmas number one single is a single that reaches number one on the national pop music charts in the week in which Christmas Day falls. It is primarily a pop culture phenomenon in the United Kingdom and Republic of Ireland.

Other charts
 Official Audio Streaming Chart#Number one songs
 List of Official Subscription Plays Chart number-one songs of the 2000s
 List of Official Subscription Plays Chart number-one songs of the 2010s (ended November 2013)
 Official Classical Singles Chart#Number ones
 Lists of UK Dance Chart number-one singles (annual lists)
 Lists of UK Indie Chart number-one singles (annual lists)
 Lists of UK Rock Chart number-one singles (annual lists)
 Lists of UK R&B Chart number-one singles (annual lists)

Scottish charts
 Scottish Singles and Albums Charts#Number ones

References

See also
 List of UK Albums Chart Christmas number ones
 List of UK Singles Chart Christmas number twos